St. Patrick's Catholic High School, frequently called St. Pat's, is a Catholic secondary school located in Sarnia, Ontario, Canada. It is one of two secondary schools in the St. Clair Catholic District School Board, and the only one located in Sarnia. In 2013 the school was merged with St. Christopher's Secondary School resulting in a population of over 1300 students.

St. Pat's is well known for its Irish Miracle and Cyclone Aid food drive which collects thousands of bags of non-perishable food items for local charities each year.

History

St. Pat's was founded in 1935, initially as a branch of Our Lady of Mercy School before relocating to its own building.

From 1986 to 2013, the school was located at the East Street Campus, on East Street and London Road. 

In 2006, a legal challenge to the school's use of a sniffer dog for a drug search reached the Supreme Court of Canada. A majority of justices ruled this to be a violation of Charter of Rights and Freedoms in R v AM.

In 2009 the school celebrated 75 years with both alumni and students.

In 1996, St. Pats was joined by a new Catholic secondary school, St. Christopher's Secondary School. The two schools operated in Sarnia from 1996 to 2013.

After the 2012-13 school year, St. Pats and St. Christopher's were amalgamated. The newly merged school retained its mascot and name from St. Pat's due to its much longer history, while adopting the combined colours green and blue from St. Christopher's. For the 2013-14 school year, St. Christopher students moved to the East Street site, while the former St. Christopher's campus was renovated to add an extra 80,000 square feet to the pre-existing building. The school moved to the enlarged St. Christopher's campus for the 2014-15 year onward. The former St. Pats campus on East Street was demolished by 2017 and the lot remains vacant.

In 2020, St. Pats hosted a in-school Rocket League eSports event led by 10 grade 11 students and teacher Robert Walicki. Most notable students named on the Sarnia Observer being Tiago Campos, Logan Lambert and Colin Wilson. St. Pats was the only high school in their county to run any sort of event during the COVID-19 pandemic. Their efforts led them into the Sarnia Observer and the Sarnia Journal newspapers.

Notable people
 Derek Drouin, High jumper, Olympic gold medalist, NCAA champion
 Kate Drummond 
 Phil Esposito, NHL hockey player

See also
 List of high schools in Ontario
 Ursuline College (Chatham)

References

External links 
 

1935 establishments in Ontario
High schools in Sarnia
Catholic secondary schools in Ontario
Educational institutions established in 1935